María Lucero Saldaña Pérez (born 18 January 1957) is a Mexican politician affiliated with the PRI. She currently serves as Senator of the LXII Legislature of the Mexican Congress representing Puebla. She also served as Deputy during two periods (1988–91 and 1994–97) and as Senator between 2001 until 2006.

References

1957 births
Living people
People from Puebla (city)
Women members of the Senate of the Republic (Mexico)
Members of the Senate of the Republic (Mexico)
Members of the Chamber of Deputies (Mexico)
Institutional Revolutionary Party politicians
21st-century Mexican politicians
21st-century Mexican women politicians
Women members of the Chamber of Deputies (Mexico)
Universidad de las Américas Puebla alumni
Autonomous University of Barcelona alumni
Members of the Congress of Puebla
Politicians from Puebla
Senators of the LXII and LXIII Legislatures of Mexico